Cornel Rasanga Amoth (born 22 May 1957) is a Kenyan politician. He is a member of the Orange Democratic Movement and was elected as the first governor of Siaya County.

Early life
Rasanga popularly known amongst his supporters as Pemblepe was born on 22 May 1957 to the late Senior Chief Amoth Owira and the late Yunia Nudi in Segere Village, Alego, in Siaya County. He attended Segere Primary School between 1963 and 1970 and Maranda High School for his O-Level secondary education between 1970 and 1974. He proceeded to Kisii High School for his A- level Secondary Education where he completed in 1977. Rasanga joined the University of Nairobi in 1979 and graduated with a Bachelor of Arts in Economics degree in 1981.

Career
In 1982, Rasanga entered the public service in the Ministry of Agriculture as a supplies officer in charge of National Agricultural laboratories. To advance his knowledge in procurement, he joined the Kenya Institute of Administration (KIA) where he attained a Diploma in Supplies Management in 1985. Rasanga proceeded to work as a supplies officer in different districts and was promoted to senior procurement officer in charge of procurement and materials management. In 2000, Rasanga went back to university to pursue a law degree and graduated in 2003 from the University of Nairobi with a Bachelor of Law (LLB). He was admitted as an advocate of the High Court in 2005.

Political career
Rasanga entered politics in 2013 when he vied for Governor for Siaya County. The Orange Democratic Movement selected Rasanga as its candidate after a disputed nomination between Oburu Odinga and Oduol. He won the 4 March general election but his election was nullified by the Court of Appeal in Kisumu on 23 August. Rasanga clinched the governorship in a subsequent by-election and became the first governor-elect of Siaya County.In 2017 he won the gubernatorial seat again flooring the then public accounts committee chair and Rarieda Mp Nicholas Odero Gumbo

References

Living people
1957 births
County Governors of Kenya
Orange Democratic Movement politicians
21st-century Kenyan lawyers
People from Siaya County
Alumni of Maranda High School
University of Nairobi alumni